The CMLL Torneo Nacional de Parejas Increíbles (2020) or the National Incredible Pairs Tournament (2020) was the 2020 version of an annual professional wrestling tag team tournament held by the Mexican wrestling promotion Consejo Mundial de Lucha Libre (CMLL). The tournament is based on the Lucha Libre Parejas Increíbles match concept, which pairs two wrestlers of opposite allegiance, one portraying a rudo, the antagonists of professional wrestling, and one portraying a técnicotécnico, the protagonist of professional wrestling

The 2020 version of the tournament is the eleventh year in a row that CMLL held the tournament since the first tournament in 2010. The winners are presented with a trophy but not given any other tangible reward for the victory. The tournament started with the first block of eight teams on February 14, 2020, and ran over three Super Viernes shows. In the end, the team of Carístico and Forastero defeated Bárbaro Cavernario and Volador Jr. to win the tournament.

History
The Mexican professional wrestling promotion Consejo Mundial de Lucha Libre (CMLL; "World Wrestling Council") held their first Torneo Nacional de Parejas Increíbles ("National Incredible Pairs Tournament") in 2010, from January 22 through February 5, marking the beginning of what became an annual tournament. CMLL has previous held Parejas Increíbles tournaments on an irregular basis and often promoted individual Parejas Increíbles and Relevos Increíbles ("Incredible Relay", with teams of three or more wrestlers). The  Parejas Increíbles concept is a long-standing tradition in lucha libre and is at times referred to as a "strange bedfellows" match in English speaking countries, because a Pareja Increible consists of a face (referred to as a técnico in Lucha Libre, or a "good guy") and a heel (a rudo, those that portray "the bad guys") teamed up for a specific match, or in this case for a tournament. The 2020 tournament will be the eleventh annual Parejas Increíbles tournament, and like its predecessors held as part of CMLL's regular Friday night CMLL Super Viernes ("Super Friday") shows.

Tournament background
The tournament itself featured 15 professional wrestling matches with different wrestlers teaming up, some of whom were involved in pre-existing scripted feuds or storylines while others were simply paired up for the tournament. For the Torneo Nacional de Parejas Increíbles tournaments, CMLL often teamed up a técnico (those that portray the "good guys" in wrestling, also known as faces) and a rudo (the "bad guy" or heels).  who are involved in a pre-existing storyline feud at the time of the tournament so that the tournament itself can be used as a storytelling device to help tell the story of escalating confrontations between two feuding wrestlers. The tournament format follows CMLL's traditional tournament formats, with two qualifying blocks of eight teams that competed during the first and second week of the tournament and a final match between the two block winners. The qualifying blocks are all one-fall matches while the tournament final will be a best two-out-of-three-falls tag team match.

Tournament participants
Key

Block A
Bandido  and Último Guerrero 
Carístico  and Forastero 
Diamante Azul   and Gilbert el Boricua 
Dulce Gardenia  and Okumura 
Flyer  and Hechicero 
Guerrero Maya Jr.  and Universo 2000 Jr. 
Niebla Roja  and El Felino 
Titán  and Mephisto 
Block B
Ángel de Oro  and Sansón 
Atlantis Jr.  and Negro Casas 
Blue Panther  and Fuerza Guerrera 
Rey Cometa  and Espíritu Negro 
Soberano Jr.  and Templario 
Stuka Jr.  and Gran Guerrero 
Valiente  and El Cuatrero 
Volador Jr.  and Bárbaro Cavernario

Tournament brackets

Tournament shows
February 14, 2020 

February 21, 2020 

February 27

References

2020 in professional wrestling
CMLL Torneo Nacional de Parejas Increibles
Lucha libre